Wild ox may refer to:

Animals
Aurochs, or wild ox
Kouprey, sometimes called wild ox
Banteng, or wild ox
Gaur, or wild ox
Re'em, a Biblical animal sometimes translated as wild ox

People
Vsevolod IV of Kiev, or Wsiewolod the Wild Ox

See also
Ox (disambiguation)

Animal common name disambiguation pages